The Iguela Hunting Area is found in Gabon.

This reserve belongs to group IV according to the IUCN classification.

References

Protected areas of Gabon